Football is the most popular sport in Qatar. Football in Qatar is organized by the Qatar Football Association (QFA).

Qatar hosted 2021 FIFA Arab Cup. It hosted the 2022 FIFA World Cup. It will also host the 2023 AFC Asian Cup and the 2024 AFC U-23 Asian Cup.

History

Football was introduced to the country in 1948 when oil workers organized a match among themselves. The first football club was established in 1950 under the name 'Al-Najah', which went on to form Al Ahli. This was followed by the organization of the first football tournament in 1951 called 'Izz al-Din Championship' by the Qatar Oil Company. In the late 1950s, the name was changed to 'Pukett Cup'.

The QFA was formed in 1960 and the first league season was launched in 1963–64. League matches were played in Doha Sports Stadium, which accommodated the first grass football pitch in the region.

Spectatorship

Attendance at QSL matches ranges between 2,000 and 10,000, depending on the popularity of the teams. In a 2014 survey conducted by Qatari government ministries and departments, 65% of the 1,079 respondents indicated that they did not attend a football match in the previous league season. Lack of time, unsuitable atmospheres for females and the presence of paid fans were all major factors for not attending. The highest deterrent was climate, which was cited by seventy-three percent respondents as impacting their decision to attend a football match.

As an initiative to gauge public opinion and increase local participation in sports with an emphasis on football, the Supreme Committee for Delivery & Legacy (SC) launched the Jeeran program in April 2015. The program involves seeking the opinion and advice of people in majlises, as well as encouraging large-scale community involvement, particularly by women.

Most successful teams

National team

The Qatar national team has had limited international success and has often been accused of abusing naturalisation laws to acquire players. However, they did win the Arabian Gulf Cup three times and won their first AFC Asian Cup in 2019. It has also participated in the 2022 FIFA World Cup.

Women's National team

FIFA World Cup
In 2010, Qatar won the bid to host the 2022 FIFA World Cup, becoming the first Arab country to host the tournament. Following a controversy over bidding, a report by FIFA cleared Qatar’s name from all allegations.

In June 2019, the FIFA Council announced Qatar as the host of 2019 FIFA Club World Cup and 2020 FIFA Club World Cup.

In March 2022, FIFA president Gianni Infantino claimed in an interview that the gulf nation is being progressive in terms of its labor rights & migrant rights issues that prevailed in the nation previously by adding "I am pleased to see the strong commitment from the Qatari authorities to ensure the reforms are fully implemented across the labour market, leaving a lasting legacy of the FIFA World Cup long after the event, and benefiting migrant workers in the host country in the long term."

On Thursday 11 August 2022, FIFA officially moved up the opening match of this year's World Cup by one day to November 20 in an unusual change for hosts Qatar to appear in the gala game.

Qatar hosted the 2022 FIFA World Cup from November 20 to December 18 2022. The Champions of this edition of the FIFA World Cup were the Argentine National Football Team.

See also
Qatar Football Association
Qatar football league system
Qatari clubs in the AFC Champions League
List of football stadiums in Qatar

References